Glycoprotein 130 (also known as gp130, IL6ST, IL6R-beta or CD130) is a transmembrane protein which is the founding member of the class of all cytokine receptors. It forms one subunit of the type I cytokine receptor within the IL-6 receptor family.  It is often referred to as the common gp130 subunit, and is important for signal transduction following cytokine engagement. As with other type I cytokine receptors, gp130 possesses a WSXWS amino acid motif that ensures correct protein folding and ligand binding.  It interacts with Janus kinases to elicit an intracellular signal following receptor interaction with its ligand.  Structurally, gp130 is composed of five fibronectin type-III domains and one immunoglobulin-like C2-type (immunoglobulin-like) domain in its extracellular portion.

Characteristics 
The members of the IL-6 receptor family all complex with gp130 for signal transduction. For example, IL-6 binds to the IL-6 Receptor. The complex of these two proteins then associates with gp130. This complex of 3 proteins then homodimerizes to form a hexameric complex which can produce downstream signals. There are many other proteins which associate with gp130, such as cardiotrophin 1 (CT-1), leukemia inhibitory factor (LIF), ciliary neurotrophic factor (CNTF), oncostatin M (OSM), and IL-11. There are also several other proteins which have structural similarity to gp130 and contain the WSXWS motif and preserved cysteine residues. Members of this group include LIF-R, OSM-R, and G-CSF-R.

Loss of gp130 

gp130 is an important part of many different types of signaling complexes. Inactivation of gp130 is lethal to mice. Homozygous mice who are born show a number of defects including impaired development of the ventricular myocardium. Haematopoietic effects included reduced numbers of stem cells in the spleen and liver.

Signal transduction 

gp130 has no intrinsic tyrosine kinase activity. Instead, it is phosphorylated on tyrosine residues after complexing with other proteins. The phosphorylation leads to association with JAK/Tyk tyrosine kinases and STAT protein transcription factors. In particular, STAT-3 is activated which leads to the activation of many downstream genes. Other pathways activated include RAS and MAPK signaling.

Interactions 

Glycoprotein 130 has been shown to interact with:
 Grb2, 
 HER2/neu, 
 Janus kinase 1 
 Leukemia inhibitory factor receptor, 
 PTPN11, 
 SHC1,
 SOCS3,  and
 TLE1.

References

Further reading

External links 
 

Glycoproteins
Molecular biology
Type I cytokine receptors